The 1999 Brazilian Grand Prix (formally the XXVIII Grande Prêmio Marlboro do Brasil) was a Formula One motor race held on 11 April 1999 at the Autódromo José Carlos Pace in São Paulo, Brazil. It was the second race of the 1999 Formula One season. The 71-lap race was won by McLaren driver Mika Häkkinen after starting from pole position. Michael Schumacher finished second in a Ferrari with Heinz-Harald Frentzen third for the Jordan team.

Ricardo Zonta did not qualify for the race, after he had injured his left foot in a big crash during Saturday's practice.

Report

Background

Driver changes
The race marked the debut for Stéphane Sarrazin, who drove the Minardi for an injured Luca Badoer. Badoer had injured his hand in a testing accident, and Sarrazin - then the test driver for Prost - was drafted in to Minardi.

As Luca Badoer returned for the following race, and he was still the test driver for Prost, it was Stéphane Sarrazin's only entry in Formula One.

Race
At the start of the race, pole sitter Mika Häkkinen raced off with the lead, while his McLaren teammate David Coulthard stalled on the grid. McLaren at this point had been reeling from a double-DNF at the season-opening Australian Grand Prix, and Coulthard's failure raised eyebrows at the team. Coulthard's car was pushed into the pit lane, where it was restarted as the leaders began lap 4.

On lap 4, local hero Rubens Barrichello took the lead of the race from Mika Häkkinen after Häkkinen's car suffered a temporary transmission malfunction and was unable to select any gears. Häkkinen was also passed by Michael Schumacher before his car regained the ability to select gears. Barrichello was able to stay in front until he pitted on lap 27. It was the first time a Stewart car had led a race. The crowd of roughly 80,000 cheered wildly as "Rubinho" built a lead of about 5 seconds over Schumacher.

Alexander Wurz and Damon Hill collided on lap 10, ending Hill's race. Rubens Barrichello fell to fourth place after his pit stop, and Michael Schumacher took over the lead. David Coulthard's day ended when he pulled off the track with a mechanical failure. Stéphane Sarrazin, in his only F1 entry, had a massive crash on the pit straight on lap 31 after suffering a wing failure, with him spinning more than six times. On lap 35, Barrichello passed Eddie Irvine under braking into the first corner to take third place.

Michael Schumacher came in for a pit stop on lap 38, allowing Mika Häkkinen past. Häkkinen had been held up by Schumacher, so he began trying to build up enough of a gap so he could come out ahead of Schumacher after his own pit stop. Lap traffic delayed his progress at first, but after one lap he was able to turn in a couple of fast laps. He pitted on lap 42, and his fast laps combined with quick work by his pit crew allowed him to easily retain the lead over Schumacher.

On lap 42, Pedro Diniz spun off and beached his car after trying to pass another car to the inside. Rubens Barrichello's race ended on the same lap with a blown engine. Eddie Irvine came in for an unscheduled pit stop on lap 55 to clear the radiators of his overheating Ferrari, dropping him back to fifth.

Mika Häkkinen won the race, with Michael Schumacher second. Heinz-Harald Frentzen was classified third despite running out of fuel on the final lap, as the next car was a lap down. Ralf Schumacher finished fourth after being closely pursued by Eddie Irvine for the last few laps. 10th race win for Mika Häkkinen.

Classification

Qualifying

1. Qualified 16th, stripped of time due to illegal fuel.

Race

Championship standings after the race

Drivers'    Championship standings

Constructors'    Championship standings

 Note:  Only the top five positions are included for both sets of standings

References 

Brazilian Grand Prix
Brazilian Grand Prix
Grand Prix
Brazilian Grand Prix